Iran participated in the 2007 Asian Winter Games held in Changchun, China from January 28, 2007 to February 4, 2007.

Competitors

Results by event

Skiing

Alpine

Men

Women

Cross-country

Men

Snowboarding

Men

References

External links
 2007 Winter Asiad official website

Asian Winter Games
Nations at the 2007 Asian Winter Games
2007